The 2001–02 NBDL season was the inaugural season for the National Basketball Development League. The league started with eight teams: Asheville Altitude, Columbus Riverdragons, Fayetteville Patriots, Greenville Groove, Huntsville Flight, Mobile Revelers, North Charleston Lowgators and Roanoke Dazzle. The season ended with the Groove defeating the Lowgators 2–0 in the best-of-three Finals series to win the inaugural NBDL championship.

Regular season standings

Statistics leaders

Source: Basketball-Reference

Season award winners

All-NBDL Teams
First Team:
Forward: Tremaine Fowlkes – Columbus Riverdragons
Forward: Ansu Sesay – Greenville Groove
Center: Thomas Hamilton – Greenville Groove
Guard: Isaac Fontaine – Mobile Revelers
Guard: Billy Thomas – Greenville Groove
Second Team:
Forward: Derek Hood – Mobile Revelers
Forward: Sedric Webber – North Charleston Lowgators
Center: Paul Grant – Asheville Altitude
Guard: Omar Cook – Fayetteville Patriots
Guard: Terrell McIntyre – Fayetteville Patriots
Honorable Mention:
Forward: Nate Johnson – Columbus Riverdragons
Forward: Rahim Lockhart – Greenville Groove
Forward: Gabe Muoneke – Columbus Riverdragons
Forward: Greg Stempin – Fayetteville Patriots
Center: Jeff Aubry – Fayetteville Patriots
Center: Eric Chenowith – Huntsville Flight
Guard: Nate Green – North Charleston Lowgators
Guard: Artie Griffin – Roanoke Dazzle
Guard: Fred House – North Charleston Lowgators
Guard: Jimmie Hunter – Huntsville Flight
Guard: Jeff Myers – Greenville Groove

Source: NBA.com

Playoffs
There were only 8 teams in the league. For the playoffs, the four teams with the best record in the league were seeded one to four. Each round of the playoffs were played a best-of-three series.

Source: NBA.com

References